The 2023 Southeastern Conference Men's Basketball Tournament is the postseason men's basketball tournament for the Southeastern Conference to be held at the Bridgestone Arena in Nashville, Tennessee, from March 8 to 12, 2023.

Seeds 
All 14 SEC teams are scheduled to participate in the tournament. Teams will be seeded by record within the conference, with a tiebreaker system to seed teams with identical conference records. The top 10 teams will receive a first round bye and the top four teams will receive a double bye, automatically advancing them into the quarterfinals.

Schedule 

*Game times in Central Time. #Rankings denote tournament seeding.

Bracket 

* denotes overtime period</onlyinclude>

Game summaries

First round

Second round

Quarterfinals

Semifinals

Final

See also 

 2023 SEC Women's Basketball Tournament

References 

2022–23 Southeastern Conference men's basketball season
SEC men's basketball tournament
Sports competitions in Nashville, Tennessee
2023 in sports in Tennessee
Basketball competitions in Nashville, Tennessee
College basketball tournaments in Tennessee